Miloš Raičković (born 2 December 1993) is a Montenegrin professional footballer who plays for Kazakh club FC Aktobe.

Club career

FK Buducnost Podgorica
A product of the Crvena Stijena from Tološi, a suburb of Podgorica, and the Buducnost Podgorica youth systems, Raičković helped his team clinch the 2012–13 Montenegrin Cup aged 19, making 112 appearances in all competitions during his time there and winning the 2016-17 Montenegrin First League trophy.

Sarawak FA
Attracted by the prospect of playing professionally overseas in Asia, the Montenegrin signed for Sarawak of the Malaysia Super League in the summer of 2017 as the club needed a player to improve their midfield. Arriving in Malaysia, the midfielder praised his teammates for their friendliness in helping him adapt, with Sarawak coach David Usop confident on his quality as well. Raickovic responded to this with an important goal for his team in the 65th minute of the 2017 Malaysia Cup group stage 5th round, beating Selangor 2–1. He was also complimented by his coach for leading the attack and displaying good control in a 2–0 triumph over Kelantan, Sarawak's third win in the 2017 Malaysia Super League.

Seongnam FC
On 17th June 2022, Raičković joined Seongnam FC of South Korean K League 1.

International career
Recording 20 appearances with the youth categories of the Montenegro national team, Raickovic has stated his ambition to represent the senior team of Montenegro internationally. He made his senior debut in an October 2020 friendly match against Latvia.

Playing style
A circumspect, phlegmatic player, Raickovic can operate as either a center midfielder or defensive midfielder and is known for his sagacious attacking movements and vision for an accurate pass. In addition, he specializes in long shots and can move up in attack as well.

Honours
Buducnost Podgorica
 Montenegrin First League: 2016–17, 2019–20, 2020–21
 Montenegrin Cup: 2012–13, 2018–19, 2020–21

References

External links

1993 births
Living people
Footballers from Podgorica
Association football midfielders
Montenegrin footballers
Montenegro youth international footballers
Montenegro under-21 international footballers
Montenegro international footballers
FK Budućnost Podgorica players
FK Bratstvo Cijevna players
Sarawak FA players
Seongnam FC players
Montenegrin First League players
Montenegrin Second League players
Malaysia Super League players
K League 1 players
Montenegrin expatriate footballers
Expatriate footballers in Malaysia
Expatriate footballers in South Korea
Montenegrin expatriate sportspeople in Malaysia
Montenegrin expatriate sportspeople in South Korea